Clan Alpine was a steam ship built in 1899 by the William Doxford & Sons of Pallion. She was the second ship named Clan Alpine in service with the Clan Line used on their Oriental routes.

Design and construction
In 1899 Clan Line sold their old steamer Clan Alpine, and placed an order with William Doxford & Sons of Pallion to build three ships for them (future Clan Alpine, Clan Farquhar and Clan Urquhart). The ship was launched on 22 September 1899 (25 September 1899 according to other source), with Miss Greta Doxford, daughter of William Theodore Doxford, being the sponsor. The vessel was commissioned in November of the same year.

Operational history
In early 1900s, the Clan Line operated two main routes between United Kingdom and her colonies in the East. The first one was a direct route from the home ports through the Strait of Gibraltar, Suez Canal and to the ports of India and Ceylon. The second one involved sailing down the western coast of Africa first to the ports of South African colonies, then onto the ports of Ceylon and India, and occasional trips to Australia.

Upon delivery, Clan Alpine proceeded to Middlesbrough and from there to Glasgow for loading, where she arrived on 18 November 1899. From there, the ship sailed to Liverpool and Manchester to load more cargo. She departed from Manchester to Bombay for her maiden journey on 12 December 1899, passing through Suez Canal on 30 December and arriving in Bombay on 13 January 1900. After calling at several Indian ports Clan Alpine left for England, passed through Suez Canal on 13 February and arrived in Dunkirk on 3 March. After unloading the ship proceeded to England and arrived at Greenock on 15 March. After a brief stop, the ship left Greenock on 22 March 1900, stopped to load cargo at Liverpool and departed from there for Cape Town on 29 March. After calling at various South African ports the ship sailed to Ceylon via Mauritius and arrived at Galle on 3 July. From Galle the ship continued on to India including Madras, where she arrived on 28 July. From India Clan Alpine departed for England via Colombo and arrived in London on 8 September 1900 before continuing on to Glasgow which she reached on 22 September. She soon departed for another trip, leaving from Liverpool for Calcutta on 6 October 1900.

Clan Alpine continued service on both routes through the rest of her career.

On 22 November 1908 Clan Alpine departed Liverpool for South Africa. On 11 December 1908 it was announced that Clan Alpine was chartered to transport wheat from South Australia to England and Europe. The vessel arrived at Cape Town on 19 December 1908 from Liverpool, left there on 23 December, calling at Mossel Bay and Port Elizabeth and arriving at East London on 31 December 1908. Clan Alpine departed from East London on 2 January 1909 and continued on to Australia. She arrived at Adelaide from East London in South Africa on 23 January 1909 and immediately continued on to Geelong arriving there three days later.

Sinking
On 10 June 1917 Clan Alpine was torpedoed and sunk 40 nautical miles of Muckle Flugga, Shetland Islands on a passage from Tyne to Archangel with a loss of 8 crew by German submarine U-60.

Notes 

1899 ships
Steamships of the United Kingdom
Merchant ships of the United Kingdom
Maritime incidents in 1917
World War I shipwrecks in the Mediterranean Sea
Ships sunk by German submarines in World War I
Ships of the Clan Line